English singer and songwriter Louis Tomlinson has released two studio albums, ten singles, ten music videos and one promotional single.

On 10 December 2016, Tomlinson released his debut single with Steve Aoki titled "Just Hold On" reaching number two in the UK Singles Chart and certified platinum in the UK. In 2017 Tomlinson released "Back to You" with American singer Bebe Rexha, certified platinum in the US and UK; "Just Like You" and "Miss You".

In 2019, Tomlinson had signed with Arista Records.

Tomlinson released the singles "Two of Us" a song devoted to his mother on March 2019, "Kill My Mind" on September 2019, "We Made It" on October 2019, "Don't Let It Break Your Heart" in November 2019 and "Walls" on January 2020.

His debut studio album Walls was released on 31 January 2020. The album debuted at number 4 on the UK Albums Chart and number 9 on the Billboard 200 chart, making it the first new album for Arista Records in almost nine years to hit the top 10 on the chart. In 2020, he debuted a new song, "Copy of a Copy of a Copy" at his live streamed concert and in 2021, he debuted another song, "Change", at his festival titled "Away From Home Festival".

Studio albums

Singles

As lead artist

Promotional singles

Other charted songs

Songwriting credits

Videography

Music videos

Notes

References 

Discographies of British artists